FK Dunav Stari Banovci is a football club based in Stari Banovci, Vojvodina, Serbia. They compete in the Vojvodina League South, the fourth tier of the national league system.

History
The club won the Vojvodina League West in the 2010–11 season and took promotion to the Serbian League Vojvodina. They participated in the 2012–13 Serbian Cup, being eliminated in the opening round to Metalac Gornji Milanovac. After spending a decade in the third tier, the club placed second from the bottom in the 2020–21 season and suffered relegation to the Vojvodina League South.

Honours
Vojvodina League West (Tier 4)
 2010–11

Seasons

Managerial history

References

External links
 Club page at Srbijasport

1936 establishments in Serbia
Association football clubs established in 1936
Football clubs in Serbia
Football clubs in Vojvodina